This is a list of flag bearers who have represented Mozambique at the Olympics.

Flag bearers carry the national flag of their country at the opening ceremony of the Olympic Games.

See also
Mozambique at the Olympics

References

Mozambique at the Olympics
Mozambique
Olympic flagbearers
Olympic flagbearers